The Mother may refer to:

 Mother (Gorky novel), 1906 novel by Maxim Gorky
 The Mother (Brecht play), a play by Bertolt Brecht based on Gorky's novel, first performed in 1935
 The Mother (Pearl S. Buck novel), first published in 1934
 The Mother (Čapek play), a play by Karel Čapek written in 1938
 The Mother (TV play) (1954), by Paddy Chayefsky
 The Mother, a 2010 play by Florian Zeller
 The Mother (2003 film), a film directed by Roger Michell
 The Mother (2023 film), an American action film
 Mirra Alfassa (1878–1973), spiritual collaborator of Sri Aurobindo, a Hindu spiritual leader
 The Mother (How I Met Your Mother), a fictional television character

See also
 Mother (disambiguation)